Brandywine Asset Management, Inc. is an American investment management firm founded and managed by Michael Dever.  The firm is registered as a commodity trading advisor.

History
Michael Dever began personal discretionary trading in 1979.

Dever founded Brandywine Asset Management, Inc. in 1982, and Brandywine continued trading futures on a discretionary basis.

In the 1980s, Dever began developing computer studies on commodity price behavior.  The basic research and portfolio modeling concepts Brandywine uses today were developed through a major research project conducted from 1987 to 1991 using staff researchers and students and faculty from several universities, including the Wharton School of the University of Pennsylvania, Villanova University, and West Chester University.  The purpose of these studies was to test all of the ideas that Dever had accumulated to determine if they were statistically valid.

Beginning in 1989, Brandywine developed the Brandywine Benchmark Program, which Brandywine traded 1991-1998.  The Brandywine Benchmark Program was a broadly diversified, fully computerized program, which incorporated trend-following, seasonal, arbitrage, and fundamentally based strategies.  The Brandywine Benchmark Program stopped trading in late 1998 as Dever began to focus on his venture development business.

Dever is a pioneer in risk management and is credited with the development of one of the earliest comprehensive risk management models.  In the 1980s, he developed a statistically based money management and risk allocation model.  The purpose of the model was to allocate weightings equally to the strategies and markets within a portfolio in order to maintain balance of returns from all strategy-market combinations.  The intent of this portfolio allocation model is to ensure that no single market or strategy-market combination dominates the portfolio over an extended period of time.  Since that time, elements of this trading model have become popularized as risk parity investing.  In 1991, this model was incorporated in the Brandywine Benchmark Program, which was the first trading program to use risk parity portfolio management.

During the years 1999-2007, Brandywine traded multiple strategies and programs, including mutual fund arbitrage, market neutral equity, long-short equity, and futures strategies.  In addition, Brandywine's allocation to venture capital investing grew to over 50% of its business.

Brandywine believes in the dynamic nature of markets and the importance of taking an active approach to research.  The firm is built on a structure and a philosophy that requires continuous identification and development of new strategies for portfolio diversification.

The offices of Brandywine are located in an award-winning renovated 17th century grist mill in the Brandywine Valley, outside of Philadelphia, Pennsylvania.  The mill renovation project, which includes an actual reconstructed operating mill waterwheel, was designed by Thomas Dever, principal of Dever Architects and brother of Michael.  The project was awarded a 1997 Building Excellence Award by the Philadelphia Business Journal.

Current Status
Brandywine's trading approach is fundamentally based yet systematically applied.

The Brandywine Collective Investment Trust was launched in 2023 and is based on Brandywine's 40+ years of investing experience. The Trust contains a suite of investment funds that are designed to solve for "Sequence of Return" risk in retirement plans.

Investment Philosophy
The two cornerstones of Brandywine's investment approach are diversification and non-correlation of strategies and markets.  Brandywine implements a multi-strategy approach, which is unique in the industry.  Brandywine's philosophy is to create a relatively hedged portfolio, not by buying hedges which cost a premium but by incorporating multiple trading strategies in the portfolio which complement each other.  Brandywine follows a methodology based on "return drivers" to trade broadly diversified portfolios in the global currency, interest rate, stock index, metals, energy, and agricultural futures markets.  A return driver is the core underlying reason that drives the price of a market.  Brandywine's investment philosophy is based on the belief that the most consistent, persistent, and predictable investment returns across a variety of market environments are best achieved by combining multiple uncorrelated trading strategies (each designed to profit from a logical, distinct return driver) into a truly diversified portfolio.  Each strategy must have a high significance of occurring in the future.

Brandywine's trading philosophy is based on broad strategy and market diversification.

True diversification can only be achieved by diversifying across return drivers and trading strategies, not asset classes.  Most investors are taught to build a portfolio based on asset classes (such as stocks and bonds) and to hold the positions for the long term.  According to Dever, this approach is the equivalent of gambling.

Brandywine focuses on the permanence of trading strategies and seeks to develop strategies with a strong probability of remaining valid over time (a generation or more).  Dever does not have confidence in short term, technically driven strategies because he believes these strategies are not based on sound return drivers and, in most cases, are random.

A trading strategy has two components:  a system that exploits a return driver and a market that is best suited to capture the returns promised by the return driver.

Brandywine's investment process is based on the scientific method and includes the following primary elements:
Start by identifying a return driver.
Develop the concept into a trading strategy.
Test the trading strategy across many markets and time frames.
Combine hundreds of different strategy-market combinations into a diversified portfolio.

Brandywine minimizes event risk. Diversified portfolios are subject to far lower event risk than conventional portfolios.  Leverage can even be added to a diversified portfolio, and the diversified portfolio would still have less event risk and volatility than a conventional portfolio allocated to stocks (60%) and bonds (40%). Brandywine's philosophy is to incorporate as many diversified return drivers as possible in the portfolio so that they are not all subject to the same external events.  But there is always the risk of loss, regardless of the amount of diversification.

Dever believes that drawdowns are the largest impediment to strong, positive returns over time.

References

External links
Brandywine Asset Management, Inc.
Jackass Investing - Official Website
Mind Drivers
"Mike Dever of Brandywine: The Interview" | Michael Covel | The Trend Following Manifesto | February 14, 2012
The Wall Street Journal This Weekend | May 5, 2012
"Dever: Experts Are No Better at Managing Money" | Bloomberg TV | May 31, 2012
"Mike Dever on the Podcast for a Return Visit: New and Extended" | Michael Covel | The Trend Following Manifesto | July 3, 2012
Mike Dever on "Money Matters" | July 23, 2012
"Breaking Down Investing Myths" | Bloomberg TV | July 24, 2012

Investment management companies of the United States
Alternative investment management companies
Financial services companies established in 1982
1982 establishments in Pennsylvania